Tetratheca exasperata is a species of flowering plant in the quandong family that is endemic to Australia.

Description
The species grows as a small shrub to 10–35 cm in height, with dark pink to pink-purple flowers.

Distribution and habitat
The range of the species lies within the Avon Wheatbelt, Jarrah Forest and Warren IBRA bioregions of south-west Western Australia, some 200–300 km south to south-east of the city of Perth. The plants grow on white-grey sand, sandy loam, and orange-brown gravelly loam soils.

References

exasperata
Eudicots of Western Australia
Oxalidales of Australia
Plants described in 2007